Rhabdophis nigrocinctus, also known as the black-striped keelback, green keelback, or banded keelback, is a keelback snake in the family Colubridae found in Myanmar, Thailand, Laos, Cambodia, Vietnam, and Yunnan (SW China).

References

External links
 Thai National Parks, Rhabdophis nigrocinctus

Rhabdophis
Reptiles of Cambodia
Snakes of China
Snakes of Vietnam
Snakes of Asia
Reptiles of Laos
Reptiles of Myanmar
Reptiles of Thailand
Reptiles of Vietnam
Reptiles described in 1856
Taxa named by Edward Blyth